Wasley is a surname. Notable people include:
  (1899–1978), French actor
 James Wasley (born 1979), Australian rules footballer
 Jay Wasley, star of Ghost Adventures
 Laura Wasley (born 1984), Manx cyclist
 Mark Wasley (born 1965), Australian cricketer
 Michael Wasley (born 1990), British snooker player
 Patricia Wasley, educator